El Guindo (Spanish for the cherry tree) is a Chilean village located in Pichilemu, Cardenal Caro Province. As of the 2002 census, the population comprised 25 people, and 8 households.

References

Populated places in Pichilemu